The Java Web Services Development Pack (JWSDP) is a free software development kit (SDK) for developing Web Services, Web applications and Java applications with the newest technologies for Java.

Oracle replaced JWSDP with GlassFish. All components of JWSDP are part of GlassFish and WSIT and several are in Java SE 6  ("Mustang").  The source is available under the Open Source Initiative-approved CDDL license.

Java APIs 
These are the components and APIs available in the JWSDP 1.6:
 Java API for XML Processing (JAXP), v 1.3
 Java API for XML Registries (JAXR)
 Java Architecture for XML Binding (JAXB), v 1.0 and 2.0
 JAX-RPC v 1.1
 JAX-WS v 2.0
 SAAJ (SOAP with Attachments API for Java)
 Web Services Registry

Starting with JWSDP 1.6, the JAX-RPC and JAX-WS implementations support the Fast Infoset standard for the binary encoding of the XML infoset. Earlier versions of JWSDP also included

 Java Servlet
 JavaServer Pages
 JavaServer Faces

Related technologies 
There are many other Java implementations of Web Services or XML processors.  Some of them support the Java standards, some support other standards or non-standard features.  Related technologies include:
 Eclipse Metro - web services stack from GlassFish
 Apache Axis - web services framework
 XINS - RPC/web services framework
 xmlenc - XML output library
 JBossWS - web services stack from JBoss

References

External links 
 SAAJ from sun.com
 Sun Microsystems JWSDP Site

Web Services Development Pack
Web services
Software development kits
Free software